A constitutional referendum was held in France on 8 May 1870. Voters were asked whether they approved of the liberal reforms made to the constitution since 1860 and passed by the Sénatus-consulte on 20 April 1870. The changes were approved by 82.7% of voters with an 81.3% turnout. However, France's defeat in the Franco-Prussian War caused the Empire to be abolished later that year. Although this was the ninth constitutional referendum in French history, it was the first to have more than 8% oppose the motion; four of the previous seven had officially gained 99% approval.

Results

References

Referendums in France
1870 in France
1870 referendums
Constitutional referendums in France